Tabataba is a 1988 film directed by Raymond Rajaonarivelo.

Synopsis 
Tabataba tells the story of a small Malagasy village during the independence uprising which took place in 1947 in the south of the country. For several months, part of the Malagasy population revolted against the French colonial army in a bloody struggle. The repression in villages that followed was terrible, leading to fires, arrests and torture. Women, children and the elderly were the indirect victims of the conflict and suffered particularly from famine and illness. One leader of the MDRM, the party campaigning for independence, arrives in a village. Solo (François Botozandry), the main character, is still too young to fight but he sees his brother and most of the men in his clan join up. His grandmother, Bakanga (Soavelo), knows what will happen, but Solo still hopes his elder brother will return a hero. After months of rumours, he sees instead the French army arrive to crush the rebellion.

Awards
 Prix du public, Quinzaine des rèalisateurs, Festival de Cannes, 1988 
 Prix du jury, Taormina Film Fest, 1988
 Prix de la première oeuvre, Carthage Film Festival, 1989

References

External links

Raymond Rajaonarivelo – Tabataba (1988)

Malagasy drama films
1988 drama films